Csaba Mester (born 12 August 2002) is a Hungarian footballer who currently plays as a forward for Austria Wien.
He was part of the Hungarian U-17 team at the 2019 FIFA U-17 World Cup,

Career statistics

References

2002 births
Living people
Hungarian footballers
Hungary youth international footballers
Association football forwards
Győri ETO FC players
FC Red Bull Salzburg players
FK Austria Wien players
2. Liga (Austria) players
Hungarian expatriate footballers
Expatriate footballers in Austria
Hungarian expatriate sportspeople in Austria